The 2018–19 Arizona State Sun Devils men's ice hockey season was the 4th season of play for the program at the Division I level. The Sun Devils represented Arizona State University and were coached by Greg Powers, in his 9th season.

Season
For the program's fourth year as a varsity squad, the Sun Devils produced their first winning record. The team also was ranked by both national polls for the first time and made its first ever NCAA Tournament appearance. Goaltender Joey Daccord became the first Sun Devil ever selected as an AHCA All-American. After Arizona State had finished its season, Daccord also became the first alumni to appear in an NHL game after signing with the Ottawa Senators.

Departures

Recruiting

Roster

As of March 20, 2019.

|}

Standings

Schedule and results

|-
!colspan=12 style=";" | Regular season

|-
!colspan=12 style=";" | 

|-
!colspan=12 style=";" |

Scoring Statistics

Goaltending statistics

Rankings

*USCHO did not release a poll in weeks 11, 12 and 25.

Awards and honors

NCAA

Players drafted into the NHL

2019 NHL Entry Draft
No Arizona State players were selected in the NHL draft.

References

Arizona State Sun Devils men's ice hockey seasons
Arizona State Sun Devils
Arizona State Sun Devils
2019 in sports in Arizona
2018 in sports in Arizona